Paulina Harriet de Gorostarzou (1811–1891) was a French-Spanish industrialist and philanthropist.
She is known as the founder of the Colegio Nuestra Señora de Lourdes in Valladolid in 1884. 

She married the textile merchant Juan Dibildos Barhó in 1840. The couple founded a tanning factory in Valladolid. When she was widowed in 1874, she took over the business personally. 

She died 16 November 1891.

References

1811 births
1891 deaths
French emigrants to Spain
Spanish philanthropists
19th-century Spanish businesswomen
19th-century Spanish businesspeople
19th-century philanthropists
19th-century women philanthropists